A Bigger Piece of Sky is an album by Texas-based folk singer-songwriter Robert Earl Keen.  It was released in the United States in 1993 by Sugar Hill Records and re-released in SACD format with the originally intended track sequencing in 2004 by Koch Records.  The title of the album comes from a line in the opening verse of "Paint the Town Beige":
I gave up the fast lane for a blacktop country road
Just burned out on all that talk about the mother lode,
I traded for a songbird and a bigger piece of sky
When I miss the good old days I can't imagine why.

The album is frequently cited to be one of Keen's best if not the best and is considered to be a transitional point in his career as an artist. The album brings together various elements of alternative country such as roots-rock, honky tonk, and folk to form Keen's own cohesive blend of Texas music.  Reviewers cite "Corpus Christi Bay", "Whenever Kindness Fails", "So I Can Take My Rest", and "Paint the Town Beige" as stand-out tracks. Keen's down-beat duet with Irish singer Maura O'Connell, "Night Right for Love" is also worthy of note as is Keen's cover of Terry Allen's "Amarillo Highway".  Other guest performers include Marty Stuart on mandolin and Garry Tallent on electric and upright bass.

Track listing

Personnel
Musicians:
 Robert Earl Keen – lead vocals and acoustic guitar
 George Marinelli – harmony vocal on "Paint the Town Beige", and electric guitar
 Tommy Spurlock – acoustic guitar, steel, lap steel, and gut string guitar
 Garry Tallent – Electric bass and Upright bass
 Dave Durocher – harmony vocal on "Corpus Christi Bay", drums and percussion
 Jonathan Yudkin – violin
 Marty Stuart – mandolin
 Jay Spell – accordion
 Michael Snow – additional vocals on "Blow You Away", bodhran, and tenor banjo
 Bryan Duckworth – violin on "Crazy Cowboy Dream"
 Dave Heath – upright bass on "Crazy Cowboy Dream" and harmony vocals on "Jesse", "Amarillo Highway", and "Crazy Cowboy Dream"
 Maura O'Connell – duet vocal on "Night Right for Love", harmony vocal on "So I Can Take My Rest", and additional vocal on "Blow You Away"
 Jennifer Prince – harmony vocal on "So I Can Take My Rest"

Production:
 Produced – Garry Velletri (except "Amarillo Highway" by Garry Velletri and Dave Durocher)
 Recorded – Jeff Coppage, July 1992 at The Board Room, Nashville, Tennessee
 Mixed – Jeff Coppage and Garry Velletri
 Digital editing – Neal Merrick at Merrick Music Studios
 Mastered – Denny Purcell at Georgetown Masters

Artwork:
 Cover – "Slow Poke" by Ray C. Strang
 Back Cover – photo by Peter Figan
 Design – Diane Painter

External links
Koch Entertainment album website

Notes and sources

1993 albums
Robert Earl Keen albums
Sugar Hill Records albums